Poor White Trash may refer to:

Poor White Trash (film), a 2000 film by Michael Addis
Poor White, an American subculture

See also
White trash, an American English pejorative term referring to individual or groups of lower social class Caucasian people that the speaker considers to lack social status